is a subway station on the Tokyo Metro Tozai Line in Shinjuku, Tokyo, Japan, operated by Tokyo Metro. Its station number is T-04. It is separate from Waseda Station on the Tokyo Sakura Tram.

Lines
Waseda Station is served by the Tokyo Metro Tōzai Line.

Platforms

History
The station opened on 23 December 1964.

The station facilities were inherited by Tokyo Metro after the privatization of the Teito Rapid Transit Authority (TRTA) in 2004.

References

External links

Tokyo Metro station information

Railway stations in Japan opened in 1964
Stations of Tokyo Metro
Tokyo Metro Tozai Line
Railway stations in Tokyo